Nick Gates may refer to:

 Nick Gates (American football) (born 1995), American football guard
 Nick Gates (cyclist) (born 1972), Australian road bicycle racer